"Thinkin' Back" is an R&B and Pop song by American music group Color Me Badd from their debut album, C.M.B. (1991). It was released as the fifth single (fourth in North America) in January 1992. The song is about a deteriorating relationship, and while the protagonist's partner did them wrong, they are still lonely, and want to turn back time to go back to when their relationship was in a good place.

"Thinkin' Back" was another successful single, but did not perform as well as its 3 preceding songs (all which were top 2 hits, and performed strongly worldwide). On the US Billboard Hot 100, the song reached number #16 on April 4, 1992, and lasted 20 weeks on the chart. It also peaked at #31 on Hot R&B/Hip-Hop Songs chart lasting 9 weeks on the chart, and #35 in Canada, while not charting anywhere else internationally.

Music Video

The music video was directed by Marcus Nispel, and was filmed/produced by Portfolio Artists Network. It was shot in black and white, and was edited to coincide with the conceptual theme in the video regarding the passage of time, as each edit aligned with the beats of the music. It received strong recurring play and support on MTV, and to a lesser extent BET, which helped the performance of the song.

Critical reception

Larry Flick from Billboard wrote, "Those Badd boys show no sign of cooling off, thanks to this lush, R&B-powered ballad. Spotlight is on group's tightly woven harmonies and  song's romantic lyrics. Another multiformat hit from the "C.M.B." album."

Track listings
US Vinyl, 12, Promo"
A1 Thinkin' Back (Radio Edit)	3:49
A2 Thinkin' Back (XXX Version)	4:39
B1 Thinkin' Back (Album Version)	5:22
B2 Thinkin' Back (A Cappella)	5:22

US Vinyl, 7"
1 Thinkin' Back (Album Version)	5:23
2 Thinkin' Back (XXX Version)	4:39

US CD, Single, Promo"
1 Thinkin' Back (Radio Edit)	3:49
2 Thinkin' Back (XXX Version)	4:39
3 Thinkin' Back (More Radio Edit)	3:44

US CD, Single, Promo"
1 Thinkin' Back (Edited Master)	3:56
2 Thinkin' Back (A Cappella)	4:08
3 Thinkin' Back (Album Version)	5:26
4 Thinkin' Back (Pop Mix With Piano)	6:54

US Cassette, Single"
A Thinkin' Back (Album Version)	5:22
B Thinkin' Back (XXX Version)	4:39

Personnel
Producer – Hamza Lee, Royal Bayyan
Written-By – Color Me Badd, Hamza Lee, Troy Taylor (9)(10)

Charts

Weekly charts

Year-end charts

References 

1992 songs
1992 singles
Color Me Badd songs
Giant Records (Warner) singles
Songs written by Sam Watters